Tushek & Spigel Supercars GmbH is an Austrian-Slovenian manufacturer of supercars, founded in Slovenia under the name 'Tushek' and based in Graz, Austria, at a former military airport which included a private racetrack that is used for testing.  The company was founded by Aljoša Tushek and Jacob Carl Spigel.

Description 
Supercar startup Tushek, founded by Slovenian racing driver Aljoša Tushek, first hit the scene back in 2012 when it unveiled the Renovatio T500 at Top Marques Monaco. Since then, Tushek relocated its operations from Slovenia to Austria, and rebranded itself Tushek & Spigel. During the 2014 Top Marques Monaco, Tushek & Spigel presented a new model, the Tushek TS 600. The company also presented a new model, the Tushek TS900 Apex, during the 2018 Top Marques Monaco.

Models 
 Tushek TS500 (2012)
 Tushek TS600 (2014)
 Tushek TS900 Racer Pro (?)
 Tushek TS900 Apex (2018)

References

External links 
 
 
 * 

Sports car manufacturers
Vehicle manufacturing companies established in 2012
Austrian brands
Slovenian brands
Car manufacturers of Slovenia
Economy of Styria